Quipile is a municipality and town of Colombia in the Tequendama Province of the department of Cundinamarca. The municipality borders Bituima and Vianí in the north, Jerusalén and Anapoima in the south, Anolaima, Cachipay and La Mesa in the east and San Juan de Rioseco and Pulí in the west.

Etymology 
The name Quipile comes from the Cariban language of the Panche and means "strong and superior place". It is derived from Quipili, the name of the cacique of the Panche.

History 
In the time before the Spanish conquest of the Muisca, Quipile was inhabited by the Panche who were submitted to the Spanish rule of the New Kingdom of Granada in the Battle of Tocarema which took place on August 20, 1538.

The date and name of the founder is unknown but traditionally set at November 12, 1825 by José María Lozano.

Economy 
Quipile is an agrarian community with main products coffee, sugarcane and bananas cultivated.

Paleontology 
In 1956 fossil remains of Megatherium and Mastodon; Pleistocene megafauna dated at 460,000 years BP, were discovered within the boundaries of Quipile.

References 

Municipalities of Cundinamarca Department
Populated places established in 1825
Prehistory of Colombia